The House of Commons (Redistribution of Seats) Act 1949 was an Act of the Parliament of the United Kingdom that provided for the periodic review of the number and boundaries of parliamentary constituencies.

The Act amended the rules for the distribution of seats to be followed by the boundary commissions for each of the constituent countries of the United Kingdom.  The commissions had been created under the House of Commons (Redistribution of Seats) Act 1944, and their initial reviews of constituencies had been implemented by the Representation of the People Act 1948.

Under the 1949 Act, each commission was to make its first periodic report within seven years of the passing of the Representation of the People Act 1948. Subsequent reports were to be issued not less than three and not more than seven years after the first periodic report. Reports were to be made to the Home Secretary, and were to contain the proposed constituency boundaries. The Home Secretary could then issue a draft Order in Council, to be approved by both houses of parliament. Once approved, the draft order would be presented to the Privy Council, and enacted via a statutory instrument. Any changes in seats would not take place until the next dissolution of parliament and calling of a general election.

Rules for redistribution of seats

The Act contained a number of rules to guide the work of the commissions.

Number of constituencies
Great Britain was to have "not substantially greater or less than" 613 constituencies.
Scotland was to have not less than 71 constituencies.
Wales was to have not less than 35 constituencies.
Northern Ireland was to have 12 constituencies.
Every constituency was to return a single Member of Parliament.

Rules on dividing and combining counties and districts
"As far as practicable" in England and Wales: 
The City of London was not to be divided, and the name of the constituency in which it was included had to include the term "City of London".
No constituency was to combine the whole or parts of different administrative counties and county boroughs or metropolitan boroughs were not be included with adjacent counties.
No county borough (or any part thereof) was to be included in a constituency with any other county borough or part of a metropolitan borough.
No metropolitan borough was to be included in a constituency which included the whole or part of any other metropolitan borough.
No county district (municipal borough, urban district or rural district) was to be included partly in one constituency and partly in another.

In Scotland:
No burgh other than a county of a city was to be divided between constituencies

In Northern Ireland: 
No county district was to be included partly in one constituency and partly in another.

Electorate
The electorate of any constituency was to be as close as possible to a country-specific electoral quota to reduce malapportionment; where rigid adherence to the "as far as practicable" guidelines would mean a large disparity between electorates, the commissions were expressly empowered to form seats which combine parts of two (and where major disparity still remains, more) local government areas.

The electoral quota was obtained by dividing the total electorate for either Great Britain or Northern Ireland by the number of allocated seats.

Special geographical considerations
Each commission were allowed to depart from the rules on areas or electorate in special cases "including in particular the size, shape and accessibility of a constituency" in order to form constituencies.

Amendment and repeal
Following successful legal action the Act was amended by the House of Commons (Redistribution of Seats) Act 1958. This removed the Director General of the Ordnance Survey from each commission, and in each case appointed a judge to be deputy chairman. It also modified the definition of "electoral quota" so that it – in England, Scotland and Wales – would mean respective quotas for each country, based on the prior number of constituencies. A new procedure was established, forcing a local inquiry to be held if many objections arose to changes.

The House of Commons (Redistribution of Seats) Act 1979 amended the 1949 Act in respect to Northern Ireland, increasing the number of constituencies in the province to 17 in number. Northern Ireland had been under-represented in the Commons to compensate for the existence of a devolved parliament. However, this had been abolished in 1973. The number of seats could be decreased to 16 or increased to 18 in the future.

The 1949, 1958 and 1979 Acts were repealed by the Parliamentary Constituencies Act 1986, which remains the current primary legislation governing allocation of constituencies.

References

United Kingdom Acts of Parliament 1949
Acts of the Parliament of the United Kingdom concerning the House of Commons
1949 in British law
1949 in British politics
Constituencies of the Parliament of the United Kingdom